Party of Venetians might refer to:
Party of Venetians (2010), political party in Veneto
Party of Venetians (2019), coalition of parties in Veneto